Blessings of the Land is a 1959 Filipino drama film directed by Manuel Silos. It was entered into the 10th Berlin International Film Festival.  The film won Best Picture and Best Story from the Filipino Academy of Movie Arts and Sciences.  In 1960, it was shown at the Asian Film Festival held in Tokyo.  The story was written by Celso Al. Carunungan, while the screenplay was written by Carunungan together with Pablo Naval.  The movie was produced by LVN Pictures.

The film is a melodrama about the life of a Filipino couple residing in a village.  The couple's deaf-mute son, Miguel, is tested and "must rise above his handicap" after the tragedies experienced by the family.

Plot
Maria and Jose begin their married life by establishing a countryside orchard of lanzones.  They soon have four children, namely Miguel, Arturo, Angelita, and Lito.  They live happily in the community, until Bruno comes along; he is a widower believed to have killed his own wife.  Bruno wants to remarry and courts Choleng, a niece of Jose.  Choleng dies by falling from a cliff while trying to evade Bruno.  Bruno goes to the mountains to hide from the angry villagers, then  returns and rapes Jose's daughter, Angelita.  Together with the villagers, Jose pursues Bruno but is shot by the latter.

Jose’s son, Arturo, goes to Manila, while Jose’s other son Miguel (the deaf and mute) courts Gloria, a woman in the village.  Arturo returns from Manila accompanied by a woman from the city.  Arturo succeeds in convincing his mother, Maria, to mortgage the rice fields before going back to Manila.

A landowner from another town hires Bruno to destroy the lanzones harvest of Maria’s family.  Bruno and his group fail because of the villagers.  Miguel kills Bruno.  Arturo comes back from Manila and reconciles with his family.

Cast
 Rosa Rosal as Maria
 Leroy Salvador as Miguel
 Tony Santos, Sr. (as Tony Santos) as Jose
 Carmencita Abad as Gloria
 Carlos Padilla, Jr. as Arturo
 Marita Zobel as Angelita
 Joseph de Cordova as Bruno
 Danilo Jurado as Lito
 Carmen Del Ocampo
 Miguel Lopez
 Mario Roldan
 Tony Dantes
 Jerry Reyes
 Mila Ocampo as Choleng
 Pedro Faustino

Release
Blessings of the Land was released in Philippine theaters on December 16, 1959.

Digital restoration
The film was digitally scanned and restored by the ABS-CBN Film Restoration Project in 2019. The restoration began with the digital scanning of frames in 4K resolution using the 35mm print as its source material. The 35mm print was stored at the ABS-CBN Film Archives and compiled under the collection of the majority of LVN Pictures' library. The film was restored in 2K resolution and took 70 hours to eliminate image impairments (including scratches and unstable images) successfully. The restoration team also adjusted the film's color and brightness in order to make it closely identical to the original form.

The digitally scanned and restored 4K high definition version was first premiered on television on May 26, 2019, 9:00PM through ABS-CBN's movie channel for cable television, Cinema One. It was also premiered theatrically on October 17, 2019, as part of Centennial Classics exhibition for the QCinema International Film Festival with the attendance of the two original lead stars Rosa Rosal and Marita Zobel, as well as the representatives of the film's staff and cast members who were previously died or unable to attend including actress-singer Zsa Zsa Padilla and her daughter Zia Quizon (representing their father and grandfather, respectively), Rap Fernandez (representing his uncle), the family of Tony Santos Sr., and Toni Rose Gayda (Rosa Rosal's daughter).

On October 1, 2020, the restored version of the film was live streamed on the social networking site Facebook by ABS-CBN Film Restoration (also known as Sagip Pelikula).

Accolades

References

External links

1959 films
1959 drama films
Filipino-language films
Philippine black-and-white films
Philippine drama films